Service King Collision Repair is a national automotive collision repair company. It was founded in 1976 by Eddie Lennox in Dallas, Texas.  Service King is one of largest providers of collision repair services in Texas and the United States.

History 
Service King was founded by Eddie Lenox in 1976. Its first location was in Dallas.

In 2009, the then-independently owned Service King bought the three-location D&D Collision chain in the Houston area.

In 2012, The Carlyle Group purchased a majority stake in Service King. Around that time, it expanded into Arizona. Global investment and advisory group Blackstone purchased majority ownership in Service King in July 2014. Service King eclipsed the 200-location milestone by December 2014 by purchasing Seattle-headquartered Kirmac Collision Services to expand its footprint in the Pacific northwest. Service King hit the 300-location mark in August 2016; it also opened a 70,000 square foot center in Milpitas, California around that time.  In 2017, Blackstone and Carlyle looked at selling Service King for up to $2 billion (US). Service King opened a new corporate office located in Richardson, Texas in early 2017.

Partnerships 
Service King has started Mission 2 Hire as its own program to help employ veterans with a goal of hiring 500 veterans and veterans families in five years.

Service King partnered with the NASCAR Xfinity Series in 2017 to become the title sponsor of the Service King 300, held in March at the Auto Club Speedway of Southern California.

Locations 
Service King has locations in the following states:
Texas
California
Washington
Nevada
Utah
Arizona
Colorado
Oklahoma
Arkansas
Mississippi
Illinois
Tennessee
Michigan
Ohio
Pennsylvania
New York
Maryland
Virginia
North Carolina
Georgia
Florida

References

External links 
 http://www.serviceking.com

American companies established in 1976
Retail companies established in 1976
Automotive repair shops of the United States
Privately held companies based in Texas
1976 establishments in Texas